Jerry C. Wall (July 1, 1841 - April 8, 1923) was a Union Army soldier in the American Civil War who received the U.S. military's highest decoration, the Medal of Honor.

Wall was born in Geneva, New York, and he entered service in Milo. Wall was awarded the Medal of Honor for his actions at the Battle of Gettysburg on July 3, 1863, when he captured a Confederate Army flag as a private with Company B of the 126th New York Infantry. Two other men of the 126th New York Infantry were awarded  the Medal of Honor for their actions at Gettysburg, Morris Brown Jr. and George H. Dore.

His Medal of Honor was issued on December 1, 1864.

Medal of Honor citation

See also
List of Medal of Honor recipients for the Battle of Gettysburg
List of American Civil War Medal of Honor recipients: T–Z

References

External links

1841 births
1923 deaths
American Civil War recipients of the Medal of Honor
Burials in New York (state)
People from Geneva, New York
People of New York (state) in the American Civil War
Union Army soldiers
United States Army Medal of Honor recipients